
Pedro Cays Lighthouse is a lighted beacon  south of Jamaica on the north side of Northeast Cay (Top Cay) in the Pedro Cays. The Pedro Cays are administratively part of Kingston, Jamaica.

It is maintained by the Port Authority of Jamaica, an agency of the Ministry of Transport and Works.

See also

 List of lighthouses in Jamaica.

References

External links
 Aerial view

Lighthouses in Jamaica
Buildings and structures in Kingston Parish